The Iron Belle Trail is a set of two trails that will span the state of Michigan. The two trails, one for hiking and one for biking, connects Ironwood in the Upper Peninsula and Belle Isle State Park in Detroit. The Michigan Department of Natural Resources is coordinating the planning and construction of the missing trail segments.

It is "the longest state-designated trail in the nation."  In its more than  it crosses 48 counties and 240 townships.

Routes
The hiking trail primarily follows the Michigan segment of the North Country National Scenic Trail with connectors to Belle Isle and Ironwood.

The biking trail connects existing trail such as the Paint Creek Trail in Oakland County, the North Central State Trail between Gaylord and Mackinaw City, and U.S. Bicycle Route 10 in the Upper Peninsula parallel to new trail. The total trail is approximately 70 percent connected.

References

External links
  Michigan DNR

Bike paths in Michigan
Hiking trails in Michigan
Belle Isle Park (Michigan)